The 2010 Women's European Union Amateur Boxing Championships were held in the Hotel Helikon in Keszthely, Hungary from August 4 to August 7. The 5th edition of this annual competition was organised by the European governing body for amateur boxing, the European Boxing Confederation (EUBC). 107 fighters from 21 federations competed in 11 weight divisions.

Medal winners

Medal count table

References

2010 Women's European Union Amateur Boxing Championships
European Union Amateur Boxing Championships
Women's European Union Amateur Boxing Championships
International boxing competitions hosted by Hungary
European